Holozonia is a North American genus of flowering plants in the family Asteraceae. It contains only one known species Holozonia filipes, which is known by the common name whitecrown. It is endemic to (found only in) California.

Holozonia filipes is a scraggly rhizomatous perennial herb growing a hairy, glandular, branching stem 30 centimeters (1 foot) to 1.5 meters (5 feet) long. The lower stem is gray-green and the upper stem branches are green to red in color. The lance-shaped leaves are up to 10 centimeters (4 inches) long and covered in resin glands. They are arranged oppositely on the lower part of the stem. The flower heads appear at the ends of the stem branches in a loose inflorescence. Each head has layers of sticky, hairy phyllaries. The ray florets are each divided into long lobes and are white in color. The disc florets are white with large purple anthers.

References

External links 
 Jepson Manual Treatment, University of California
 United States Department of Agriculture Plants Profile
 Callphotos Photo gallery, University of California

Madieae
Monotypic Asteraceae genera
Endemic flora of California
Plants described in 1839
Flora without expected TNC conservation status